The women's 10 metre air pistol competition at the 2002 Asian Games in Busan, South Korea was held on 3 October at the Changwon International Shooting Range.

Schedule
All times are Korea Standard Time (UTC+09:00)

Records

Results
Legend
DNS — Did not start

Qualification

Final

References 

2002 Asian Games Report, Page 668–669
Qualification Results
Final Results

External links
Official website

Women Pistol 10